Ferocactus is a genus of large barrel-shaped cacti, mostly with large spines and small flowers. There are about 30 species included in the genus. They are found in the southwestern United States and northwestern Mexico.

Description
The young specimens are columnar but as they grow older ribs form and they take on a barrel form. Most of the species are solitary but some, such as Ferocactus robustus and F. glaucescens, have clustering habits. The flowers are pink, yellow, red or purple depending on the species, and the petals sometimes have a stripe of a darker colour.

Habitat
They are desert dwellers and can cope with some frost and intense heat. The typical habitat is hot and very arid, and the plants have adapted to exploit water movement to concentrate their biomass in areas where water is likely to be present. Like Sclerocactus, Ferocactus typically grow in areas where water flows irregularly or depressions where water can accumulate for short periods of time. They are most often found growing along arroyos (washes) where their seeds have been subjected to scarification due to water movement, but they oddly also tend to grow along ridges in spots where depressions have formed and can hold water for some period of time.

Adaptations
Ferocactus have very shallow root systems and are easily uprooted during flash floods. The "fishhook" spines and the armored web of spines enclosing the cactus body in many species of this genus are adaptations which allow the plant to move to more favorable locations. The seeds germinate in areas where water movement occurs or in areas where standing water accumulates for some period of time, and during flash floods, the hooked spines allow the plants to be caught on waterborne debris, uprooted and carried to areas where water tends to accumulate.

Cultivation
In cultivation Ferocactus require full sun, little water, and good drainage. They are popular as houseplants.  They cannot tolerate freezing temperatures for extended periods, which typically cause them to yellow, bleach, then slowly die. Propagation is usually from seeds, but clustering species such as Ferocactus robustus and F. glaucescens can be propagated by removing a rooted offset and planting it.

Ecology
Many ferocactus species are ant plants, exuding nectar along the upper meristem from extrafloral nectaries above each areole, and hosting ant colonies.

Species

Formerly placed here
 Sclerocactus brevihamatus tobuschii (W.T.Marshall) N.P.Taylor (as F. tobuschii (W.T.Marshall) N.P.Taylor)
 Sclerocactus glaucus (K.Schum.) L.D.Benson (as F. glaucus (K.Schum.) N.P.Taylor)
 Sclerocactus mesae-verdae (Boissev. & C. Davidson) L.D.Benson (as F. mesae-verdae (Boissev. & C.Davidson) N.P.Taylor)
 Sclerocactus pubispinus (Engelm.) L.D.Benson (as F. pubispinus (Engelm.) N.P.Taylor)

References

 The species list is referenced in part from cactiguide.com which is in turn referenced from several books which are listed on that site. The principal book listed there is The Cactus Family by Edward F. Anderson, (2001).

External links
Die Gattung Ferocactus (in German)

 
Cactoideae genera